Luis Antonio Jiménez Garcés (born 17 June 1984) is a Chilean former professional footballer who played as an attacking midfielder.

He was also a member of the Chile national team from 2004 to 2021, playing at the Copa América in 2004 and 2011.

Club career

Early career
Born in Santiago, Chile, Jiménez played youth football for Palestino in Chile, a club mostly made up of players of Palestinian descent. He gained Palestinian citizenship in June 2013. He started his Italian footballing career in 2002 at Ternana Calcio. During the January 2006 transfer window, Jimenez moved to Serie A side ACF Fiorentina while remaining under joint ownership with his former club, for €3 million. For Fiorentina, he generally played as a right sided winger, striker or occasionally a centre forward. His right foot is his strongest but he can also make good use of his left. He made 19 appearances during the 2005–06 season for Fiorentina, scoring 3 goals in the process.

In late June 2006, Ternana purchased back half of the rights to Jiménez from Fiorentina for €3 million. Since Ternana were to play in Italian Serie C1 in the 2006–07 season, it was highly unlikely that Jimenez would remain with them. However, although a loan deal was reached with Serie A Lazio, with an option to make the deal permanent at the end of the loan, Ternana changed the terms and made extortionate demands, which included Lazio paying the salary for four of Ternana's players. The deal fell through and Jiménez remained in Ternana. The unhappy player stated that he would not play for Ternana again and has asked FIFA to intervene and annul his contract with Ternana because of their unfair treatment.

Lazio
On 15 January 2007, Lazio finally agreed a move for Jiménez with the first season on loan, for €311,000 and on 27 January he played his first match for Lazio against Palermo.

Internazionale
On 15 July 2007, Internazionale signed him on loan from Ternana, for €1 million.
He scored his first Inter goal in extra time in the Champions League against Fenerbahce. He was rewarded with his first Inter start on 2 December against Fiorentina, where he scored the opening goal. He also started the subsequent match against Lazio on 5 December, where he set up Maicon's goal.

At the end of the 2007–08 season, Inter officially signed him on a co-ownership deal, for €6.3 million on a 3-year contract. Under coach Jose Mourinho, he played his first game against A.S. Roma coming on as a second-half substitute and scored a penalty in Inter's Italian Supercup win. Jiménez played his first game of the 2008–09 Serie A year against Sampdoria on 30 August 2008, but unfortunately picked up an injury later in a practice session. He returned from injury on 30 November 2008 when he was subbed in Inter Milan's Serie A game against Napoli. A subsequent long-term injury limited Jiménez to a total of 6 appearances for the 2008-09 Serie A season.

The co-ownership deal with Ternana was renewed on 23 June 2009.

West Ham United

Jiménez signed for West Ham United on 23 June 2009. Although a work permit had been granted a couple of weeks before, the deal was only announced after personal terms were agreed. West Ham signed Jiménez for a one-year loan initially, with an option to purchase at the end of the loan period. He made his full debut for West Ham in their 2–0 away win against Wolves on 15 August 2009. He scored his only goal for West Ham, a penalty and West Ham's fifth, in a 5–3 home win against Burnley on 28 November 2009.

Parma
On 1 February 2010, Parma signed the Chilean attacking midfielder on loan from Internazionale until June, his previous loan with West Ham United having ended prematurely. He signed as part of the deal which saw McDonald Mariga move to Internazionale. Jiménez has been sent off three times since signing for Parma. At the end of season, Parma wanted to signed him outright, but collapsed after Ternana bought back Jiménez.

Ternana
On 26 June 2010, after Inter failed to agree a price with Ternana for the remain 50% registration rights, the rights went to auction and Ternana won, for €3.177 million. made Inter profited €5.277 million in accounting (amortization approach). It is because Inter had over-amortized Jiménez's transfer fee (Inter amortized €8.4 million but only cost Inter €6.3 million only, €2.1M exceed) and €3.177 million. (Inter presented the profit as €2.154 million (market price €3.177 × 2 – contract residual value €4.2M) + €3.123 million financial income (value of Inter unpaid half €6.3 million – actual value €3.177M) ) Since Ternana would play at 2010–11 Lega Pro Prima Divisione, he did not attend the training of Ternana and Ternana sought a new buyer to sign him.

Cesena
On 31 August 2010 he was loaned to newly promoted Serie A team Cesena for €1 million with option to buy, and entered the starting line-up after the poor form of the original starting lineup. The coach put Ezequiel Schelotto into bench and Jiménez became the new second striker in the 4–3–3 formation, partnered with central forward Erjon Bogdani and wing forward Emanuele Giaccherini.

Al-Ahli Dubai
On 29 June 2011, Al-Ahli Dubai announced that Jiménez had joined the club in four-year contract.
He had a successful first season, scoring 13 goals and featuring in most of it. In the 2012–2013 season, he won the Presidents Cup with Al Ahli.

Magallanes
In May 2022, while playing for Palestino, it was announced that Jiménez would play his last match as a professional footballer on Sunday 22 against Cobresal in the Estadio Municipal de La Cisterna. The result was a 3–1 win and Jiménez made an assist for the third goal. However, he returned to the football activity after signing with Primera B club Magallanes in July 19.

International career
Jiménez represented Chile U17 at the 2001 South American U-17 Championship and Chile U20 at the 2003 South American U-20 Championship.

At senior level, he made his international debut on 28 April 2004, in a match against Peru.
On 4 June 2005, Jiménez assisted Marcelo Salas' historic 35th goal with the national team, which made Salas Chile's top scorer ever. The goal came in a qualifying match against Bolivia which Chile went on to win 3–1. Four days later, he scored twice against Venezuela in another qualification match.

Jiménez became captain of Chile during 2006 and also won the 2005–06 Chile Player of the Year award. However, he saw little national team activity under the direction of Marcelo Bielsa. On 19 June 2011, he returned in an international friendly against Estonia and was subsequently included by Claudio Borghi in the squad for 2011 Copa America. However, he stopped being called up since moving to Al Ahli.

In March 2021, after a 10-year absence, he was recalled by Martín Lasarte for a friendly match against Bolivia, in which he scored his third international goal. At 36 years and 282 days of age, Jiménez became Chile's oldest goalscorer.

International goals
Scores and results list Chile's goal tally first.

Personal life
Jiménez married Chilean model María José "Coté" López in 2006. They have triplets together, all girls: Rebeca, Isidora and Rafaela, born on 15 June 2010, and a son, Jesús, born 30 April 2016. In addition, Jiménez has a son, Diego, who was born before his marriage to María José.
On December 2008, Jiménez assaulted Mauricio Pinilla in a Santiago nightclub.

His daughter Isidora is a young football player for the Magallanes youth ranks and has been called up to train with the Chile youth squad.

The Jiménez family has a close friendship with fellow footballer Carlos Villanueva's family. In addition to the fact that Jiménez coincided with Villanueva in Al-Ittihad, Jiménez and his wife are the godparents of the Villanueva's son as well as Villanueva and his wife are the godparents of the Jiménez's children.

Honours

Club
Internazionale
Serie A: 2007–08, 2008–09
Supercoppa Italiana: 2008

Al Ahli
Arabian Gulf League: 2013–14
Arabian Gulf Super Cup: 2013
UAE President's Cup: 2012–13
UAE League Cup: 2011–12, 2013–14

Palestino
Copa Chile: 2018

References

External links

Luis Jiménez looks to escape ‘Hotel Ternana’ – article by Paolo Bandini on the player's career (April 2011)

1984 births
Living people
Footballers from Santiago
Chilean footballers
Chilean expatriate footballers
Chilean people of Palestinian descent
Chile international footballers
Chile youth international footballers
Chile under-20 international footballers
Club Deportivo Palestino footballers
Ternana Calcio players
ACF Fiorentina players
S.S. Lazio players
Inter Milan players
West Ham United F.C. players
Parma Calcio 1913 players
A.C. Cesena players
Al Ahli Club (Dubai) players
Al-Nasr SC (Dubai) players
Al-Arabi SC (Qatar) players
Al-Gharafa SC players
Qatar SC players
Ittihad FC players
Deportes Magallanes footballers
Magallanes footballers
Chilean Primera División players
Serie B players
Serie A players
Premier League players
UAE Pro League players
Qatar Stars League players
Saudi Professional League players
Primera B de Chile players
Expatriate footballers in Italy
Expatriate footballers in England
Expatriate footballers in the United Arab Emirates
Expatriate footballers in Qatar
Expatriate footballers in Saudi Arabia
Chilean expatriate sportspeople in Italy
Chilean expatriate sportspeople in England
Chilean expatriate sportspeople in the United Arab Emirates
Chilean expatriate sportspeople in Qatar
Chilean expatriate sportspeople in Saudi Arabia
2004 Copa América players
2011 Copa América players
Palestinian expatriate footballers
Association football midfielders